Stopping the Show is a 1932 Fleischer Studios animated short, directed by Dave Fleischer. While it is not the first appearance of Betty Boop, it is the first short to be credited as "A Betty Boop Cartoon."

Synopsis
Betty Boop appears on stage in a vaudeville theater. Her act consists of imitations of real-life singers, including Helen Kane, Fanny Brice and Maurice Chevalier. The cartoon audience enthusiastically cheers and applauds.

Notes and comments
 When the short was originally released, it contained a scene showing Betty singing Helen Kane's song "That's My Weakness Now." Kane, who was involved in a lawsuit over Betty's resemblance to her, complained, and the studios were forced to remove the scene from future prints.
 Clips from this short were later reused in 1934's Betty Boop's Rise to Fame.

References

External links
 Stopping The Show on Youtube
 Stopping the Show at IMDB
 Stopping the Show at the Big Cartoon Database

1932 animated films
Animated musical films
1932 films
Betty Boop cartoons
1930s American animated films
American black-and-white films
Paramount Pictures short films
Fleischer Studios short films
Short films directed by Dave Fleischer
Cultural depictions of Maurice Chevalier
1930s English-language films